Throughout this article, the $ symbol refers to the Australian dollar.

View of Geelong is an 1856 oil painting on canvas by Eugene von Guerard. The painting measures 154.5 x 89cm and is owned by the Geelong Art Gallery in Victoria, Australia.

It was purchased from English composer Andrew Lloyd Webber for $3.8M. The purchase is the second highest ever for an Australian work of art, with the top being $5.3M paid by the National Gallery of Australia for a portrait of Captain James Cook by John Webber. 

Lloyd Webber had bought the painting in 1996 for A$1.98 million.

In 1996, the painting was loaned to the Geelong Art Gallery, where it proved popular.

In 2005, Lloyd Webber offered the painting for sale via auction house Christie's of London, giving the Geelong Gallery first right of refusal. On 7 July 2006 the Geelong Gallery purchased the painting for permanent display in the Geelong Gallery, after being offered $1.5 million from the Victorian state government and the remainder being sought via a community fundraising appeal.

References

External links
It's time to bring historic painting home, says Cr McMullin
Bracks must show the money for View of Geelong
The great art robbery

Tourist attractions in Geelong
1856 paintings
Australian paintings
Landscape paintings
Paintings in Australia
Andrew Lloyd Webber
Paintings in the collection of the Geelong Gallery